The Childhood Autism Rating Scale (CARS) is a behavior rating scale intended to help diagnose autism.  CARS was developed by Eric Schopler, Robert J. Reichier, and Barbara Rochen Renner. The scale was designed to help differentiate children with autism from those with other developmental delays, such as intellectual disability.

Although there is no gold standard among rating scales in detecting autism, CARS is frequently used as part of the diagnostic process.

Evaluation criteria

The CARS is a diagnostic assessment method that rates individuals on a scale ranging from normal to severe, and yields a composite score ranging from non-autistic to mildly autistic, moderately autistic, or severely autistic.  The scale is used to observe and subjectively rate fifteen items.

 relationship to people
 imitation
 emotional response
 body
 object use
 adaptation to change
 visual response
 listening response
 taste-smell-touch response and use
 fear and nervousness
 verbal communication
 non-verbal communication
 activity level
 level and consistency of intellectual response
 general impressions

References

Autism screening and assessment tools
Screening and assessment tools in child and adolescent psychiatry